José Cândido Sotto Maior, usually known as Candinho (born January 18, 1945 in São Paulo), is a Brazilian football manager.

Honours
Al-Hilal
 Saudi Crown Prince Cup: 1984
 Saudi Professional League: 1984–85

Grêmio
 Campeonato Gaúcho: 1986

Bahia
 Campeonato Baiano: 1991
 Copa do Nordeste: 2002

Al-Ittihad
 AFC Champions League: 2004, 2005
 UAFA Club Championship: 2004–05
 Saudi Professional League: 2006–07

Vitoria
 Campeonato Baiano: 1997
 Copa do Nordeste: 1997

 Corinthians
 Campeonato Paulista: 1997, 2001

References

1945 births
Living people
Brazilian footballers
Brazilian football managers
Campeonato Brasileiro Série A managers
Expatriate football managers in Saudi Arabia
Grêmio Esportivo Catanduvense managers
Esporte Clube XV de Novembro (Jaú) managers
Esporte Clube XV de Novembro (Piracicaba) managers
Esporte Clube São Bento managers
Clube Atlético Juventus managers
América Futebol Clube (SP) managers
Al Hilal SFC managers
Grêmio Foot-Ball Porto Alegrense managers
Santos FC managers
CR Flamengo managers
Fluminense FC managers
Esporte Clube Bahia managers
Clube Atlético Bragantino managers
Guarani FC managers
Esporte Clube Vitória managers
Sport Club Corinthians Paulista managers
Associação Portuguesa de Desportos managers
Goiás Esporte Clube managers
Ittihad FC managers
Sociedade Esportiva Palmeiras managers
Association football defenders
Footballers from São Paulo
Associação Atlética Internacional (Limeira) managers